Ángela Maritza Bonilla Zapata (born December 27, 1991) is an Ecuadorian model and beauty pageant titleholder who won Miss Earth Ecuador 2015. She also won Miss Global 2016 representing Ecuador.

Biography

Early life
She was born in Urcuquí, Imbabura Province. Ángela speaks Spanish, English and Italian. She is studying Journalism at Universidad Técnica Particular de Loja.

Pageantry
Ángela is the second woman in competing at the three big national pageants in Ecuador: Miss Ecuador, Miss World Ecuador, and Miss Earth Ecuador. The first one was Estefanía Realpe from Pichincha.

Miss World Ecuador 2013 
Bonilla represented her province, Imbabura at Miss World Ecuador 2013. At the end of final night on July 4, 2013 in Guayaquil she was unplaced.

Miss Ecuador 2015 
Ángela competed at Miss Ecuador 2015, representing Imbabura. The final night was on March 14, 2015 in Guayaquil where she was one of the biggest favorites to win, but she was unplaced.

Miss Earth Ecuador 2015 
She was designated on September 2, 2015 by José Delgado, the director of Miss Earth Ecuador, as the national representative to compete in Miss Earth 2015.

Miss Earth 2015 
Bonilla competed at Miss Earth 2015 in Vienna, Austria where she was unplaced.

Miss Global 2016 
Bonilla also represented Ecuador at Miss Global 2016 in the Philippines where she won the crown.

References

External links
Official Miss Ecuador website

1991 births
Living people
Miss World Ecuador
Ecuadorian beauty pageant winners
Ecuadorian people of Spanish descent
Miss Earth 2015 contestants